Mount Seekopf is a peak (1,300 m) surmounting the east side of Lake Ober-See in the Gruber Mountains of Queen Maud Land, Antarctica. It was discovered and given the descriptive name Seekopf (lake peak) by the German Antarctic Expedition, 1938–39, under Alfred Ritscher.

Mountains of Queen Maud Land
Princess Astrid Coast